Tennur Yerlisu Lapa (born Tennur Yerlisu; November 2, 1966) is a former World and European champion Turkish female Taekwondo practitioner. She coached Turkey women's national team. Currently, she is a lecturer of sports science.

She was born on November 2, 1966 in Cologne to a Turkish family in Germany. Tennur Yerlisu studied Germanistik at Istanbul University's Faculty of Letters between 1985 and 1989. In 1993, she received a master's degree in Physical Education and Sports from Marmara University. In 1994, Yerlisu began her doctoral thesis on sports organization and management at Gazi University, receiving a PhD title in 1999.

In 1992, she began an academic career as a research fellow at the College of Sports Sciences and Technologies of Hacettepe University. She went on to lecture at the School of Physical Education and Sports at the Akdeniz University in Antalya in 2009. Her academic interest is all about recreation, on which subject she has publications at national and international level. She is a member of the Sports Science Association.

After coaching the taekwondo team of Üsküdar district from 1990 to 1992, Tennur Yerlisu became coach of the Turkey women's taekwondo national team in 1992-93, and again in 2005.

Her two siblings, sister Gülnur and brother Taner Bekir, are both formerly successful national taekwondo practitioners at World and European level. They run a family-owned company for martial arts equipment.

Achievements
  1982 European Championships - Rome, Italy -44 kg
  1984 European Championships - Stuttgart, Germany -48 kg
  1986 European Cup - İzmir, Turkey -51 kg
  1987 European Cup -Girne, Northern Cyprus -51 kg
  1987 World Championships - Barcelona, Spain -51 kg

Honors
 Milliyet Sports Awards 1987 Turkish Athlete Of The Year along with Naim Süleymanoğlu
 Hürriyet Erol Simavi Award 1987 Sportsperson of the Year

References

External links

1966 births
Sportspeople from Cologne
Living people
Istanbul University alumni
Marmara University alumni
Gazi University alumni
Turkish female taekwondo practitioners
Turkish female martial artists
Sports scientists
Academic staff of Akdeniz University
World Taekwondo Championships medalists
European Taekwondo Championships medalists
20th-century Turkish sportswomen
21st-century Turkish sportswomen